Lake Martin, a shallow  Freshwater lake on the Woady Yaloak River, is located in the Western District Lakes region of southwest Victoria, in Australian. The lake is situated adjacent to, and upstream from, the hypersaline Lake Corangamite. It is a shallow lake with a depth of less than 5 metres.

See also

 List of lakes of Victoria

References

External links
 Corangamite Catchment Management Authority
 

Lakes of Victoria (Australia)
Corangamite catchment
Rivers of Barwon South West (region)
Geography of Geelong